Samuel A. Jones (May 16, 1861 in New Berlin, Chenango County, New York – January 25, 1937) was an American politician from New York.

Life
He graduated from Oxford Academy in 1885. Then he studied law for two years, but abandoned this and became a merchant in Norwich instead. In 1886, he married Clara B. Barstow, and they had two children. He was Postmaster of Norwich from 1892 to 1899.

Jones was a member of the New York State Assembly (Chenango Co.) in 1914. He was a member of the New York State Senate (37th D.) in 1915 and 1916; and was Chairman of the Committee on Affairs of Villages.

He died in the Chenango Memorial Hospital following a heart attack.

References

Sources
 New York Red Book (1916; pg. 99)

1861 births
1937 deaths
Republican Party New York (state) state senators
People from New Berlin, New York
Republican Party members of the New York State Assembly
People from Chenango County, New York